Herbert Bliss (29 March 1890 – 14 June 1968) was an English footballer who played for Tottenham Hotspur, Clapton Orient and England. He was born in Willenhall, Staffordshire.

Career 
Bert Bliss was an inside forward who joined Tottenham from Willenhall Swifts for £10 on 12 April 1912. He had a reputation for speed, accurate passing and riffling shots on goal.

He played for Spurs between 1912 and 1922 during which time he made 215 appearances and scored 106 goals. He was a member of the team, which was promoted to the Football League First Division in 1920 and won the FA Cup in 1921. His direct play and accurate passing was a notable feature of the game and he was also instrumental in Spurs scoring the only goal of the match against Wolverhampton Wanderers.

He was transferred to Clapton Orient on 22 December 1922. After this he played for Bournemouth & Boscombe Athletic before retiring in 1926.

Bert played one game at International level for England against Scotland on 9 April 1921 (two weeks before the FA Cup Final) and alongside three other Spurs players, Jimmy Dimmock, Arthur Grimsdell and Bert Smith.

Career statistics

International

References 

England international footballers
Association football forwards
English footballers
Tottenham Hotspur F.C. players
Leyton Orient F.C. players
AFC Bournemouth players
1968 deaths
1890 births
FA Cup Final players